The 1969 NCAA University Division baseball tournament was played at the end of the 1969 NCAA University Division baseball season to determine the national champion of college baseball.  The tournament concluded with eight teams competing in the College World Series, a double-elimination tournament in its twenty-third year.  Eight regional districts sent representatives to the College World Series with preliminary rounds within each district serving to determine each representative.  These events would later become known as regionals.  Each district had its own format for selecting teams, resulting in 23 teams participating in the tournament at the conclusion of their regular season, and in some cases, after a conference tournament.  The twenty-third tournament's champion was Arizona State, coached by Bobby Winkles.  The Most Outstanding Player was John Dolinsek of Arizona State.

Tournament
The opening rounds of the tournament were played across eight district sites across the country, each consisting of between two and four teams. The winners of each District advanced to the College World Series.

Bold indicates winner.

District 1 at Amherst, MA

District 2 at Coplay, PA

District 3 at Gastonia, NC

District 4 at Minneapolis, MN

District 5 at Tulsa, OK

District 6 at Austin, TX

District 7 at Mesa, AZ

District 8 at Los Angeles, CA

College World Series

Participants

Results

Bracket

*extra innings

Game results

All-Tournament Team
The following players were members of the All-Tournament Team.

Notable players
 Arizona State: Jim Crawford, Ralph Dickenson, Larry Fritz, Larry Gura, Lerrin LaGrow, Paul Powell, Lenny Randle, Craig Swan
 Massachusetts: Bob Hansen
 Ole Miss: Steve Dillard, Archie Manning
 NYU: 
 Southern Illinois: Skip Pitlock, Mike Rogodzinski, Bill Stein, Steve Webber
 Texas: Dave Chalk, Larry Hardy, Burt Hooton, James Street
 Tulsa: Steve Rogers
 UCLA: Bill Bonham, Chris Chambliss, Mike Reinbach, Jim York

See also
 1969 NCAA College Division baseball tournament
 1969 NAIA World Series

References

NCAA Division I Baseball Championship
1969 NCAA University Division baseball season
Baseball in Austin, Texas